Ramon Enrich (Igualada, 1968) is a Catalan painter and sculptor. His artistic vocation was influenced by his father, Ramon Enrich, a knitwear manufacturer who taught himself drawing, music and architecture.

He studied Fine Arts in Barcelona, and also History (unfinished) and Graphic Arts. Late 80s, he obtained some scholarships to paint and exhibit abroad. He spent long periods in Mousonturn cultural centre in Frankfurt, and in Berlin. Great admirer of Donald Judd, he moved to the United States in 1988 and he settled down in Marfa, where Judd lived. In the Chinati Foundation and in the Judd Foundation, he exposed works he developed there. Later, he travelled to Los Angeles, where he met Ed Ruscha and worked with David Hockney. Then he settled down in New York City, where he worked as an assistant in Julian Schnabel’s studio.

He has exhibited many times in Barcelona, Amsterdam, Hong Kong, New York, Brussels and Paris. Nowadays, he lives and works in Igualada.

Works
There are some recurrent issues in his paintings concerning the relationship between architecture and landscape. He paints large empty scenarios formed by
architectural and vegetal elements, being specially interested in the simplification and essential representation of things.

They are big canvas with unanimated and mysterious choreographies coming from a reality sieved by geometrics and metaphysics. He plays with a symbolical alphabet of elements: great typographies, the cypress, manufacturing warehouses, deposits, ponds, ramps, baroque gardens. They are timeless, close to surrealism and, with an ironic treatment of landscape coming from romantic tradition.

Blaude

Cartell-zaragossa-collage

1993: Marburg Museum, Marburg (Germany)
1994: Mousonturm, Frankfurt
1994: Galeria Trece, Ventalló (Catalonia, Spain)
1994: Museu für Moderne Kunst, Mittelhof (Germany)
1999: Rare Art Properties, New York
1999: Pfund Galerie, Berlin
2001: Martin Gallery, Hong Kong
2001: Àmbit Galeria d’Art, Barcelona
2002: Galeria Ignacio de Lassaleta, Barcelona
2002: Galeria Spectrum, Saragossa
2003: Galeria Arcturus, Paris
2003: Nord LB Bank, Hamburg
2005: Maison Kregg, Brussels
2005: Galeria Il Polittico, Rome
2005: Sala Parés, Barcelona
2006: Hof&Huyser, Amsterdam
2006: Art International, Zurich
2008: Museu de Llavaneres (Catalonia, Spain)
2009: Galeria María José Castellví, Barcelona

Public and private collections
Col•lecció La Caixa, Barcelona
Colección Banco Santander, Madrid
Fundació Vila Casas, Barcelona
Collection Boudouin, Brussels
Círculo Ecuestre, Barcelona
Collection Blachère, Apt (France)
Barcelona City Council
Fundación Coca-Cola, Madrid
Tanaka Foundation, Tokyo
Colección NH, Madrid
Collection Ducasse, Paris
Donald Judd Collection, Marfa (United States)
David Hockney Private Collection, Los Angeles
Fundación Telefónica, Madrid
Carmen and Lluís Bassat Private Collection, Barcelona
Museu de l’Aigua, Barcelona
Círculo de Bellas Artes, Madrid
Deustche Bank Collection, Frankfurt
Norman Foster Private Collection, London
Eric Spiekerman, Berlin
Colección Arisa, Madrid
Collection Eneco, Rotterdam

Further projects
First award in illustration. Book of Maison Léopold, Versailles (France)
Illustrations for Tres Nadals & Tres Navidades by Quim Monzó (Quaderns Crema)
Illustration for the cover of Catalan Writing (Pen Club Català)
Illustrations for Ferran Adrià, El Bulli, by Óscar Caballero (Agnès Vienot)
Works together with the designer David Carson (Quatrat 9, Espai Gràfic)
Folder with engraving for a project by studio b-720 and David Chipperfield
Drawings for the project of Ciutat Metropolitana, by Jean Nouvel
Covers for the diary of Bibliothèques de Barcelona (libraries of Barcelona)
Sculpture for Sparkasse, Frankfurt
Public sculpture, Igualada.

Ramon Enrich has been mentioned by:
David Hockney, Quim Monzó, Lluís Pasqual, Narcís Comadira, Anatxu Zabalbeascoa, Enric Miralles, Lluís Bassat, Daniel Giralt Miracle, Luis Eduardo Aute, Anton Maria Espadaler.

References

Painters from Catalonia
Sculptors from Catalonia
Modern painters
People from Igualada
1968 births
Living people
20th-century Spanish sculptors
20th-century Spanish male artists
Spanish male sculptors
People from Marfa, Texas
Artists from New York City